The Toledo Area Athletic Conference (TAAC) is a high school athletic conference located in northwest Ohio, with member schools stretched across Lucas, Williams, and Wood counties.  It was formed in 1988, and the league sponsors football, cross country, volleyball, golf, basketball, wrestling, baseball, softball, and track & field.

Current members

Edon, Hilltop, and Montpelier are primarily members of the Buckeye Border Conference for all sports, except for football, which is the only sport that they compete in the TAAC for.

Emmanuel Christian and Maumee Valley currently do not have football teams.  Maumee Valley dropped football after the 1978 season.

Toledo Christian are members of the Northern 8 Football Conference, a conference for 8 man football.

Former members

League history
The TAAC began in 1988 when long-time rivals Danbury, Emmanuel Christian (then known as Emmanuel Baptist), Maumee Valley, and Ottawa Hills joined together with the recently expanded Toledo Christian (formerly McAuley High School) to compete in basketball.  When Cardinal Strich joined in 1995 after going without sports for a while, the league teamed with the Buckeye Border Conference to create the 12-team Toledo Buckeye League, which involved cross-over games with both leagues' members.  This setup only lasted until June 1998, but both leagues continue to have members compete against each other.

The first season for TAAC football was in 1999 with Cardinal Stritch, Danbury, Ottawa Hills, Toledo Christian and the recently added football-only Lorain Catholic competing for the inaugural title.

In 2000, Northwood left the Suburban Lakes League for the TAAC, wanting to compete with schools closer to their size.  They initially joined in all sports but football (competing as an independent in 2000), but fully joined the league the next year.

The TAAC lost its first member when Lorain Catholic closed at the end of the 2003-04 school year.

Tired of competing in the Southern Central Athletic Association that was composed of several Michigan schools, Edon and Hilltop left to compete as football-only members in the TAAC in 2005.  Former ties created in the old TBL made for the easy transition.

Emmanuel Baptist changed its name to Emmanuel Christian in the spring of 2006.

In September 2009, Gibsonburg applied for membership when it became evident that the Suburban Lakes League was going to fold in the spring of 2011.  On October 7, they were admitted as the 8th full member school in the league, after being complimented for their facilities and comparable enrollment to current members.  They became a full-voting member on January 1, 2010 and joined the league for the 2011-12 school year.

Former commissioner Dick Nowak noted that although the league was set with members, their five-year plan involved adding two more members and possibly going to a two-division format.  He would not indicate which schools are interested in TAAC membership at the time.  Rick Kaifas became the new TAAC commissioner on April 6, 2011.

In July 2012, Lakota High School and Fremont St. Joseph CC both sent letters of inquiry about joining the TAAC, concerned that the Midland Athletic League would dissolve after losing many members to other new leagues.

On May 13, 2013, Tiffin Calvert announced that they would join the TAAC right after the Midland Athletic League disbanded in the spring of 2014.

In May 2014, the TAAC approved adding NWOAL member Montpelier to its league for football only beginning with the 2016 season. Montpelier's school board approved the move in June 2014.

On December 10, 2014, Tiffin Calvert announced plans to leave the TAAC early and join the Sandusky Bay Conference beginning with the 2016-17 school year as part of the SBC's expansion plans.

On March 16, 2017, Danbury announced plans to join the Sandusky Bay Conference in the River Division of the Conference beginning in the 2018-2019 school year. They will be exiting the TAAC as one of the first original members of the conference when it first formed in 1988.

On March 20, 2017, Gibsonburg also announced plans to leave the TAAC with Danbury to join the Sandusky Bay Conference in the River Division of the Conference beginning in the 2018-2019 school year. They will be exiting the TAAC as members since the 2011-2012 school year.

In May 2017, it was announced that Stryker will join the league as a football-only member for the 2018 season.
 
In October 2019, Stryker and Toledo Christian agreed at a meeting to form the new Northern 8 Football Conference for OHSAA schools that are committing to play 8-man football for the future.  The OHSAA does not currently sponsor the 8-man game, but several member schools resorted to that option recently instead of playing the traditional 11-man game or choosing not to play out the season.  Stryker and Toledo Christian will forfeit their football membership in the TAAC, but will remain members of the Buckeye Border Conference and the TAAC respectively, for all other sports.

Beginning in the fall of 2020, Pettisville has joined the league in boys soccer only.

In June, 2022 the TAAC met with the Tri-County Conference (Michigan) to discuss a possible merger between the two leagues. Around this time Cardinal Stritch announced that they would not field an 11-man football team for the 2022 season. They hope to eventually return to play. This brought the league to only five football members, only two of which are full members.

League championships

Football champions

Boys Basketball Champions

See also
Ohio High School Athletic Conferences
List of TAAC Football Champions
Elmwood will be eighth school in NBC
Gibsonburg applies to become TAAC member
The new Toledo Border League, Dec 8, 1994 (initially called the Toledo Border League, the setup eventually became the Toledo Buckeye League)
TAAC basketball preview, Dec 1989
Gibsonburg becomes eighth member of TAAC
TAAC accepts Gibsonburg, Toledo Blade, Oct 8 2009

References

Ohio high school sports conferences